Jury is a Canadian reality television miniseries which aired on CBC Television in 1974.

Premise
This series produced in Edmonton followed the adventures of the rock band Jury, featuring the band members' in the studio, on stage and their lives outside the band's work. It was part of the 5 x 3 collection of regional CBC series.

Scheduling
This half-hour series was broadcast Thursdays at 9:30 p.m. (Eastern) from 4 to 18 July 1974.

References

External links
 

CBC Television original programming
1974 Canadian television series debuts
1974 Canadian television series endings